The Dean Forest Act 1842 (5 & 6 Vict c 65), sometimes referred to as the Ecclesiastical Districts in Forest of Dean Act 1842, was an Act of the Parliament of the United Kingdom.

The whole Act was repealed by section 1(4) of, and the Schedule to, the Wild Creatures and Forest Laws Act 1971.

See also
English land law
Dean Forest Act 1819
Dean Forest (Encroachments) Act 1838
Dean Forest Act 1667
Dean Forest Act 1861

References

United Kingdom Acts of Parliament 1842
English forest law
Forest of Dean
19th century in Gloucestershire